The Fort Hamilton Parkway station was a station on the demolished section of the BMT Culver Line. It was located at the intersection of 37th Street and Fort Hamilton Parkway in Brooklyn, New York City.

History 
This station opened on March 16, 1919 as part of the BMT Culver Line. When the IND South Brooklyn Line was extended to Ditmas Avenue and converted most of the line to the Independent Subway System in 1954, the station's service was replaced by the Culver Shuttle. On May 28, 1959, the station and the line were reduced from three tracks to two.  

By December 1960, the shuttle was reduced to a single track and platform, due to the December 1960 nor'easter and low ridership. The station closed on May 11, 1975, and the structure was demolished in the 1980s. The freight line that ran beneath the station and currently leads to the 36th–38th Street Yard can still be found embedded in the pavement across Fort Hamilton Parkway.

Station layout 
It originally had three tracks and two side platforms, although near the end of its life only utilized one track and one of the side platforms, due to the removal of the other two tracks.

References

External links
Culver Shuttle.com - Fort Hamilton Parkway station looking westbound and eastbound in 1976

Defunct BMT Culver Line stations
Railway stations in the United States opened in 1919
Railway stations closed in 1975
Former elevated and subway stations in Brooklyn